Lake Waihola is a  640 ha tidal freshwater lake located 15 km north of Milton in Otago, in New Zealand's South Island. Its area is some 9 square kilometres, with a maximum length of 6 kilometres and a mean depth of 0.75m.

It is the larger of a pair of existing lakes—the other being Lake Waipori—which lie in a small area of low hills between the Taieri and Tokomairaro. Waihola is drained by the Waipori River, a tributary of the Taieri. Both lakes are very shallow and surrounded by wetlands, including the internationally renowned and protected Sinclair Wetlands which are the home to many species of wading birds. This shallowness is reflected in the name Waihola, the southern Māori form of the word waihora, which means "spreading waters".

Lake Waihola is a popular day trip for holidaymakers from Dunedin, 40 km to the north. The small township of Waihola (population 200), nestled against the lake's eastern edge, has facilities for fishing, yachting, and waterskiing, and the lake is an important rowing venue.

History 
Lake Waihola was used in the Central Otago goldrush. Ships used to travel up the Taieri River and across to the southern side of the lake where prospectors would traverse the hills and on to Gabriel's Gully. In the early days of settlement a paddle-steamer, the Betsy Douglas, plied the lake's waters from Owhiro, near Henley in the north to Clarendon at the lake's southern end.

Lake Waihola is located at the southern end of the lower Taieri Plains and is the largest of a group of historical lakes that were once distributed between Lake Waihola and Mosgiel. Other neighbouring historical lakes include Lake Tatawai, Loch Ascog, Loch Katrine, Lake Potaka and Silverstream Lagoon

Etymology
Waihola's name creates some interest as the Māori alphabet generally does not contain the letter 'L'. It is, however, found in Southern Māori dialect, and is also found in several other central and southern South Island place names, such as Wangaloa in Otago and Little Akaloa in Canterbury. The word Waihola is generally accepted to be the southern variant of the word wai-hora, meaning "spreading waters".

Ecosystems 
Lake Waihola has attracted international interest due to the ecosystems based in a shallow freshwater tidal system. Since 2000, Danish scientists have been conducting annual studies of the lake. Waihola is reputedly the home to a species of otter, the cryptid waitoreke, but no verified sightings have ever confirmed the animal's existence.

Health warnings
Health warnings related to algae have been issued on the lake as of March 2017.

See also 
 Pitt Lake, a similar freshwater tidal lake in British Columbia, Canada.

References

Waihola, Lake
Waihola, Lake
Clutha District
Taieri River